"Gold" is the thirty-second single by B'z, released on August 8, 2001. This song is one of B'z many number-one singles in Oricon charts. As B-Sides, the single features Makkana Shiruku and Ultra Soul ~Splash Style~, a remix of the song "Ultra Soul", previously released on the album Green. The song was included in the compilation album The Ballads: Love & B'z

Track listing 
Gold
Ultra Soul ~Splash Style~

Certifications

References 
B'z performance at Oricon

External links
B'z official website

2001 singles
B'z songs
Oricon Weekly number-one singles
Songs written by Koshi Inaba
Songs written by Tak Matsumoto
2001 songs